This is a list of characters from the 33rd Super Sentai Series Samurai Sentai Shinkenger. The series incorporates heavy elements of Japan in terms of culture, mythology and Nihon Bukkyō.

Shinkengers

The  existed for eighteen generations to protect the world from the Gedoushu, demonic beings from the Sanzu River. Once becoming a Shinkenger, they must renounce their past lives in order to keep their friends and family safe in case a member of the Gedoushu targets them. The Shiba House's manor is protected by a barrier of the Modikara , keeping the Shinkengers safe.

When not in use, it assumes  as a basic communication tool. Using a personal Secret Disk allows a Shinkenger to perform a  attack depending on the element that the disk represents. With Shinken Gold, they can perform the  attack.

By accessing the Kyoryu Disk to transform into a Hyper Shinkenger, the user's Shinkenmaru transforms into the  that allows them to extend their blades over long distances.

Takeru Shiba
He was raised since childhood by Hikoma Kusakabe to act the role of the 18th head of the Shiba House after his father gave him the Sisi Origami. His upbringing made him create a facade to look very arrogant and proud to others, claiming none can match his strength and greatness, while keeping his cool in any situation. Though he was reluctant to have the vassals fight by his side, as he wanted no one else to bear the burden, he allowed their involvement after giving them the choice to turn back or become Shinkengers out of want rather than need, as long as they are willing to finish their mission to the last detail. By the time Genta arrives, Takeru's facade is revealed as he now questions himself of how it makes him strong along with learning he shares similar attributes with Juzo before defeating him. While at times it may not appear so, Takeru does cares greatly for his vassals and when Genta arrives, he becomes more open with them. However, in a fight against Juzo, it is revealed that Takeru started to value his life more which, in Juzo's opinion, makes him weaker and makes Takeru doubt himself. In reality, Takeru has been acting as a kagemusha for the true 18th head of the Shiba Clan, Kaoru, who was not yet born at the time of her father's death, having been chosen for his proficiency with Modikara and his swordsmanship. When Kaoru is injured while attempting to use the Sealing Character on Doukoku, she formally adopts Takeru, making him the 19th head of the Shiba House. After defeating Doukoku in the final battle, Takeru says goodbye to Kaoru and his vassals and stays in the Shiba House with Hikoma, resuming his days now as a true samurai.

Using a Secret Disk with the Modikara of  created by Tanba, it can be split into two swords.

: Shinken Red's enhanced form upon using the Inromaru.
: Shinken Red's secondary enhanced form after using the Kyoryu Disk, first obtained after absorbing the Modikara for power from Manpuku Arabume. In Tensou Sentai Goseiger vs. Shinkenger: Epic on Ginmaku, Hyper Shinken Red performs the  attack and the  attack with Super Shinken Blue, Pink, Green, Yellow and Gold.
: A form taken by Takeru after being brainwashed by Brajira's Dark Gosei Power to force him into cooperating with drowning the Gosei World with Sanzu River. Despite his appearance, Shinken Red retains access to his original weapons.

Ryunosuke Ikenami
 is a young man who gave up becoming a kabuki actor to answer the call of serving the Shiba House. Due to his parents' upbringing, he is extremely enthusiastic and takes his role as Takeru's vassal seriously. Ryunosuke is also the engineer behind many of the Samurai Combinations, having figured out how to combine the Origami into Tenku ShinkenOh and later into SamuraiHaOh. He is initially unreceptive towards Genta, who he once called a "wannabe" samurai. As such, Ryunosuke is typically the one to lead the other vassals in Takeru's absence. When Kaoru reveals herself, Ryunosuke becomes confused about whom to follow, because he had pledged his life to the head of the Shiba family. After he receives some advice that clears his mind, he pledges his life to Takeru Shiba. After the final battle, Ryunosuke gives Takeru a kabuki-styled farewell dance and goes back to work as a kabuki actor.

He can also borrow the Inromaru to become .

Mako Shiraishi
 is a strong-willed girl who fights for her ideals. She loves children and worked at a kindergarten prior to becoming a Shinkenger. When she was a little girl, her childhood was pushed aside when her parents moved to Hawaii without a word and left her in the care of her grandmother, who schooled her in the ways of bushidō. Chiaki and Kotoha both regard her as an older sister figure; Chiaki even addresses her as such. Though she is a horrible cook (none of the boys can stomach her cooking), Mako tries her best in order to achieve her dream of becoming a good wife and mother. Eventually, Mako is reunited with her parents and learns that her mother had become paralyzed from the waist down as a result of her tenure as the previous Shinken Pink. After the reunion and reconciliation with her mother, Mako gains a newfound conviction to defeat the Gedoushu. Because of her gentle nature, she can read other people well, especially Takeru, and readily gives her opinion regarding the situation in question. After the final battle, Mako goes to Hawaii to live with her parents.

She can also borrow the Inromaru to become .

Chiaki Tani
 is a lazy, irresponsible, selfish, and arrogant rebel. Initially, Chiaki had no interest in becoming Takeru's vassal and often clashed with him. The only reason he even worked with Takeru was because he thought it would be fun and he wanted to protect people. He is a great strategist despite his delinquency, and comes to respect Takeru as a rival when he realizes the limits of his own abilities, pledging to pass Takeru in skill someday. Chiaki was without his mother from an early age and was raised solely by his father, who planted in him the seed of his interest in martial arts. Despite not being formally trained, he is an excellent strategist and adept with surprise attacks, thanks to his imagination and free-spiritedness. When Genta arrives, Chiaki is the first to accept him into the team. Chiaki is very protective of Kotoha and seems to be uncomfortable when Genta's friend shows an interest in her. Even though he often butts heads with Ryunosuke, Chiaki respects him immensely for his skill; in fact, they work together so well that they become able to perform tasks in sync with one another. During time off from his duties, or when he is troubled, he often plays Tekken 6: Bloodline Rebellion. He prefers American surf wear and skate wear brands like Vans and especially Gotcha, whose vintage shirts he wears in most episodes. After the final battle, Chiaki plans to take his college entrance exams.

He can also borrow either the Inromaru to become  or the Kyoryu Disk to become .

Kotoha Hanaori
Very much a crybaby as a child, she is close to her older sister, Mitsuba, who had been training to be Shinken Yellow. When Mitsuba became ill and unable to serve as Takeru's vassal, Kotoha stepped up to take her place. Kotoha is deeply respectful of Takeru and wants to help him in any way she can. She has rather low self-esteem; she genuinely believes that she is stupid (she claims that the only things that she is proficient at are her swordsmanship and her flute playing) and, despite her teammates' affection for her, often feels that she is a bother to them. She idolizes Mako and strives to become more like her. Kotoha often suggests that if Mitsuba never fell ill, the Shinkengers as a whole would probably be much stronger. However, her spirits are raised after she receives a letter from Mitsuba, in which Mitsuba says that Kotoha is the true Shinken Yellow. After the final battle, Kotoha returns home to Mitsuba.

She can also borrow the Inromaru to become .

Genta Umemori
 is the son of a sushi chef who mysteriously disappeared prior to the beginning of the series, and a childhood friend of Takeru's. As a child, Genta often meddled in Takeru's training, which annoyed Hikoma greatly. Genta promised to help Takeru become a samurai, and in return, Takeru entrusted him with the Ika Disk. Years later, he is shown to have inherited the  sushi cart and to have developed his own , using the Sushi Changer to type the kanji needed. The other Shinkengers are initially suspicious of Genta until he makes his formal introduction as Shinken Gold. Though Takeru is reluctant at first, he eventually allows Genta to fulfill his promise and join the team. Genta considers himself Takeru's best friend, despite their personalities being complete opposites; Genta is as hyperactive and expressive as much as Takeru is reserved and stoic. When Kaoru reveals herself, Genta immediately disapproves of her because of his relationship with Takeru, but later accepts her when he sees that she is very kind. After the final battle, Genta leaves to open a restaurant with DaiGoyou in Paris in hopes of fulfilling his lifelong dream of receiving a three-star rating by the Michelin Guide.

In its default , Genta can harness the Electronic Mojikara to compensate for his lack of calligraphy training, as well as creating an Origami or completing the Inromaru. In combat, Shinken Gold uses sushi-themed accouterments to transform and battle, like exploding chopsticks that he uses as a projectile weapon.

: A form that Shinken Gold assumes in the special DVD The Light Samurai's Surprise Transformation through the Kyoryu Disk. In the same manner as the core five Shinkengers, his Sakanamaru transforms into the Kyoryumaru and can perform the  attack.
: Shinken Gold's enhanced form. Although normally inaccessible to him due to his lack of Shinkenmaru, it was compensated through the help of the Goseigers' Super Change Gosei Card. Appeared exclusively in Tensou Sentai Goseiger vs. Shinkenger: Epic on Ginmaku.

Kaoru Shiba
 is the true 18th head of the Shiba House, a position that Takeru was holding in her place. Because of this, she stayed in hiding while Takeru acted as her kagemusha to draw the Gedoushu away from her. When she grows tired of living in hiding, she masters the Sealing Character to defeat the Gedoushu and assumes her birthright. Even though she is kind and easy to work with, she underestimates the vassals' dedication to Takeru, and when she is injured in attempting to use the Sealing Character, she adopts Takeru and gives up her birthright to allow Takeru to lead the Shinkengers in defeating Doukoku. She makes another appearance in Tensou Sentai Goseiger vs. Shinkenger: Epic on Ginmaku, combining her Modikara with Alata's Gosei Power to create the Kaentornado card, which is used to free Takeru from his Gedou Shinken Red form, and allow all the Shinkengers to utilize the Super Shinkenger form.

Her secret training allows her to easily adopt all of the weaponry the others had used before her appearance.

Secret Disks
The  are a series of items that the Shinkengers use in conjunction with their respective weapons. When not in use, they are normally stored at the buckle of their suits.

 : A Secret Disk that allows the core five Shinkengers to access their personal weapons.
 : Shinken Red's personal Secret Disk that allows him to perform the  attack. When used in conjunction with the Lightning Disk and a second Shinkenmaru, he can perform the  attack.
When used alongside Shinken Gold, he can perform the  attack. When used alongside Shinken Yellow, he can perform the  attack.
 : Shinken Pink's personal Secret Disk that allows her to perform the  attack. When used alongside Shinken Yellow, she can perform the  attack.
When used alongside Shinken Pink, she can perform the Heaven and Earth Dance. When used alongside Shinken Blue, she can perform the Current Dust Cloud's Dance.
 : A Secret Disk that allows Shinken Red to perform the  attack. When used in conjunction with the Lion Disk and a second Shinkenmaru, he can perform the Blazing Thunderbolt Dance.
 : Shinken Green's secondary Secret Disk that allows him to summon the Kabuto Origami. When used in conjunction with the Rekka Daizantou, Shinken Red can perform the  finisher. It was originally used by Shinken Red until he obtains the Tora Disk. Used once by Shinken Pink.
 : Shinken Blue's secondary Secret Disk that allows him to summon the Kajiki Origami. When used in conjunction with the Rekka Daizantou, Shinken Red can perform the  finisher. It was originally a white disk with the kanji for "to catch". Used once by Shinken Yellow.
 : Shinken Red's secondary Secret Disk that allows him to summon the Tora Origami. When used in conjunction with the Rekka Daizantou, he can perform the  finisher. It was originally a disk with the kanji for "reverse", used by Takeru to counter Hitomidama's control over Ryunosuke and the Tora Origami.
When used alongside Shinken Blue, he can perform the Current Hundred Fillets.
 : Shinken Gold's secondary Secret Disk that allows him to summon the Ika Origami. In childhood, Takeru gave it to Genta in secret from Hikoma.
When used in conjunction with the Rekka Daizantou, Shinken Red can perform the  finisher.
 : Allows user to transform into a  form. In other media not within the series' canon, a member of the Nanashi Company is able to use the Super Disk and Inromaru to become a Super Nanashi.
 : Allows ShinkenOh and DaiKaiOh to combine into DaiKai ShinkenOh.
 : Allows Shinken Red to turn the Shinkenmaru into the Kyouryumaru, become Hyper Shinken Red and summon the Kyoryu Origami. In other media not within the series' canon, Shinken Gold can also use the Kyoryu Disk to become Hyper Shinken Gold. When placed in the Mantan Gun as the Kyoryu Soul, it gives the Mantan Gun Rod Mode the same powers as the Kyoryumaru.
 : Allows all eleven Origami (sans Kyoryu) to combine into SamuraiHaOh. A larger version of the Disk acts as the left-hand side of the Ushi Origami's gissha (which becomes MouGyuDaiOh's right foot) and becomes the front disk of SamuraiHaOh's cannon.
 : Allows user to summon the Ushi Origami. A larger version of the Disk acts as the right-hand side wheel of the Ushi Origami's gissha (which becomes MouGyuDaiOh's left foot) and is used in MouGyuDaiOh's finisher.
 : Powers the Mougyu Bazooka.
 : Allows a single Shinkenger to form ShinkenOh through the Inromaru.
 : Allows a single Shinkenger to form Tenku ShinkenOh through the Inromaru.
 : A Secret Disk with the Shiba House Mojikara created by Kaoru.

Origami
The Shinkengers control sentient mecha called . The five main Origami are normally in  until they assume  to support their masters. The three support Origami, two of which were reclaimed after being lost in the last great battle with the Gedoushu, are summoned using each Secret Disk and require twice the amount of Modikara than the regular Origami. With the Engines, the Origami can perform the  attack.

 : Shinken Red's lion Origami that forms the main body, normally in its pentagon shaped Emblem Form. In battle, the Sisi Origami charges at the enemy to perform its  attack.
 : Shinken Blue's Japanese dragon Origami that forms the left leg and helmet, normally in its hexagon shaped Emblem Form. In battle, the Ryu Origami is able to shoot a stream of blue fire in its  attack.
 : Shinken Pink's sea turtle Origami that forms the right arm, normally in its circle shaped Emblem Form. While giant and in emblem form, the Kame Origami can create a whirlwind while spinning towards its opponent.
 : Shinken Green's bear Origami that forms the right leg, normally in its square shaped Emblem Form. In battle, the Kuma Origami is able to stand up and use its claws.
 : Shinken Yellow's Japanese Macaque Origami that forms the left arm, normally in its triangle shaped Emblem Form. In battle, the Saru Origami uses its fists in punching attacks.
 : An orange-colored Hercules beetle support Origami summoned from the Kabuto Disk, the Kabuto Origami can twist its head to use its horn to trip an enemy or fire energy blasts from long distances. On ShinkenOh, the Kabuto Origami adds shoulder armaments and an alternate helmet. The Kabuto Origami forms part of the right wing, feather tips, and the head of DaiTenku.
 : A cyan-colored marlin support Origami summoned from the Kajiki Disk, the Kajiki Origami uses its bill as a sword and can fire its  at the enemy. It forms part of the left wing and tail of DaiTenku.
 : A white tiger support Origami summoned from the Tora Disk, this Origami uses its drill-like limbs as weapons. It forms the main body of DaiTenku.
 : A violet/white-colored squid support Origami that resides in an aquarium on Genta's sushi cart. Nicknamed , in battle, the Ika Origami can perform its  attack to spit ink at its opponent. It also forms the stand and main gun of IkaTenku Buster.
 : Shinken Gold's lobster Origami created by Genta that transforms into DaiKaiOh and forms most of the body of DaiKai ShinkenOh. In battle, the Ebi Origami can use its claws to either grapple opponents or perform the  attack. When not in battle, it resides in an aquarium with the Ika Origami on Genta's sushi cart. Genta has nicknamed it , a name Ryunosuke disliked at first because it is the same as a great figure of kabuki, but the reference was never brought up again.
 : A crimson/black-colored dinosaur support Origami with sharp teeth and elastic neck.
 : A massive red-colored ox Origami that drags a black gissha behind it. It was the first Origami created by chance more than three centuries ago by the people of Mount Tsunobue, but due to an excess of Modikara, it was unable to be controlled in those days and was sealed within the mountain until the Ushi Disk was created in modern times. Once brought back its senses, Shinken Red takes the Origami for the group. ShinkenOh can ride atop of the gissha with the Ushi Origami still pulling it.

Samurai Giants

Both of ShinkenOh's arms can also fold back up to unleash a beam attack.
Oden/Daruma Otoshi: Although not a real transformation, this was the first form the Shinkengers had made with their Samurai Combination. In episode 2, Ryunosuke gives a brief explanation of the Samurai Combination before initiating it. Unfortunately, not knowing that it required Takeru's command through the use of Mojikara, the Origami Giants merely stacked one on top of the other, Chiaki's being the bottom, followed by Ryunosuke, Mako above, Kotoha on the top, and Takeru floating around. It is referred to as Oden by Kotoha and referred to as Daruma Otoshi by the Ayakashi Ootsumuji.
: A combination of ShinkenOh with the Tora Origami through the  Mojikara, granting it four upper back-mounted drills.
: A combination of ShinkenOh with the Ika Origami through the  Mojikara, granting it a squid head-themed spear to perform  and a tentacle-themed shield that allows it to spray the  gas.
: A  formed by ShinkenOh and DaiTenku through the  Mojikara,  giving it aerial combat.
: A  between ShinkenOh and DaiKaiOh, allowing it to perform the  finisher with the Lobster Swords.
: A combination of Kabuto, Kajiki and Tora Origami into a bird-like formation for dogfighting with another aerial-oriented opponents.
: A  formed by DaiTenku and Ika Origami into a cannon and platform for another Samurai Giant to use as a weapon to perform its  finisher. However, due to the strain of Mojikara of  used, the weapon can only be fired once in a battle.
: The Ebi Origami's Samurai Transformation and Shinken Gold's main Samurai Giant, initiated through the  Mojikara. The Daikaioh has four modes that are signified by a different face and cardinal direction, each with a different Electronic Mokikara.
: The defensive form that has  as its Electronic Modikara and a green face, using an iron fan to deflect attacks.
: A secondary combat form that has  as its Electronic Modikara and a blue face, using twin katana as its weapons to perform the  attack.
With the squid head-themed spear, Ika DaiKaiOh can perform the  finisher.
: A Samurai Transformation of Ushi Origami and its cart, as well as serving as Shinken Red's personal Samurai Giant. In this form, MouGyuDaiOh is able to unleash a torrent of firepower from its shoulder cannons in its  attack and can also use the enlarged Mougyu Bazooka as its side weapon.
: The  of eleven Origami, which involves a Samurai Giant being moved by a platform formed by the Ushi Origami's gissha. Due to its massive size, SamuraiHaOh cannot move under its own power and instead moves along using the Ushi Origami's gissha.
: The true final combination of all twelve Origami formed when SamuraiHaOh is armed with the Kyoryutou to perform the  finisher.
: A formation of all the Origami and Engines as that appeared in Samurai Sentai Shinkenger vs. Go-onger: GinmakuBang!!. In this formation, ShinkenOh, DaiKaiOh, MouGyuDaiOh, KyoretsuOh, and EngineOh G9 use the IkaTenku Buster to perform the  finisher.

Allies

Hikoma Kusakabe
 is Takeru's retainer and guardian. He also serves as the Shinkengers' mentor; it is he who gathered the four vassals when the Gedoushu revived. The Shinkengers affectionately call him . Every year, he gets one day off, which he uses to visit his wife's grave and visit his daughter and granddaughter. His relationship with Takeru and his vassals runs deep; he takes great care to ensure that they are safe and that they are ready to fight, and he supplies them with information and weaponry. Though Genta frequently annoys him, Hikoma acknowledges the younger man's skill with Modikara and eventually does accept and connect with him. Like Mako, he is adept at reading people and often helps the vassals with their personal problems. When he goes to a hospital to be treated for a hip injury, he happens upon the Hikari Studio and gives invaluable advice to Tsukasa Kadoya during the meeting of the worlds of Kamen Rider Decade and Samurai Sentai Shinkenger. While Hikoma does not typically take up arms himself, his "battle" is to ensure that Takeru and his vassals remain safe and will always have someplace to which they can return. When Kaoru makes her appearance, Hikoma remains loyal to Takeru, but bears no ill will towards Kaoru; he respects her for both her title and for the kind and diligent young woman that she is. After the final battle, he stays with Takeru even when he insists that he go visit his family and encourages Takeru to join him to experience other lifestyles other than just the samurai life.

Kuroko
The  are the Shiba House's servants who, like their namesakes, "set up" the scene during the Shinkengers' transformation. As they do not possess Modikara proficiency, they are not able to fight against the Gedoushu physically and as such, they are not directly involved in combat, although they do help evacuate civilians away from danger. They are skilled in many comparatively mundane things and are tasked with doing household chores, and help citizens in the nearby town to the best of their ability, when the Shinkengers are not in battle. Kaoru has her own group of Kuroko, who wear slightly different robes bearing the Shiba family crest.

 : A former kuroko who had previously served Masataka, much like Ryunosuke serves Takeru. After the previous head of the Shiba House died, Sakutaro lost his will to continue as a servant of the Shiba House and took to the life of a fisherman. However, meeting Ryunosuke opens Sakutaro's eyes to the reason why he had served the Shiba House as he helps Ryunosuke in obtaining the Kajiki Origami. He later secretly resumes his duty as a kuroko; he helps Ryunosuke through his own crisis of confidence, and gives Kaoru a larger fan with which she can put Tanba in his place.

DaiGoyou
DaiGoyou also has the ability to fly in his paper lantern mode. Genta originally designed DaiGoyou after the lanterns carried by the Jitte-wielding  guardsmen from old samurai films. Ryunosuke points out that these were mere guardsmen and not samurai, so the kanji for Samurai on DaiGoyou's lantern is actually a misrepresentation, much to Genta and DaiGoyou's chagrin.

While combined, he requires occasional Secret Disk jam-clearing, which simply requires slapping the bottom of the lantern's handle.
: An alternative formation where an enlarged DaiGoyou replaced the Sisi Origami as the ShinkenOh's torso.

Other characters
 Takeru's father: Takeru's unnamed father and one of the Shiba clan's vassals. He and his wife were killed in the crossfire between the 17th generation of Shinkengers and Gedoushu, entrusting Takeru with the role of kagemusha and the Sisi Origami.
 : Ryunosuke's father and the previous Shinken Blue, his teacher in both the ways of kabuki and bushidō.
 : Kotoha's older sister. She was meant to be Shinken Yellow, but when she suddenly falls ill, Kotoha takes her place to continue their family's support of the Shiba House.
 : A foreigner who comes to idolize the Shinkengers after he is cured of the Yamiororo Poison in Act 7. He approaches Ryunosuke and asks to become his pupil in the ways of bushidō. Although Ryunosuke tries to deter Mr. Brown from becoming a samurai, his attempts fail and Ryunosuke is nearly killed after he must rescue Mr. Brown after a failed attack on Hachouchin. After Ryunosuke recovers and Mr. Brown reminds the other Shinkengers of the spirit of being a samurai, they defeat Hachouchin and Mr. Brown returns to his homeland to teach bushidō to his fellow citizens.
 : Natsumi Hikari is Tsukasa's friend who works at the photo studio under her grandfather, having lived with him since her childhood.  guest stars as Natsumi Hikari from Decade.
 : Chiaki's father and the previous Shinken Green. He was supposed to teach Chiaki the ways of bushidō, but instead of putting Chiaki through rigorous training, raised him to be a cheerful boy. In reality, his way of life was meant to inspire Chiaki to become a samurai on his own, rather than be conditioned into the role.
 : The chief priest of Tengen Temple, the family temple of the Shiba line, who has custody of the unfinished Inromaru.
 : A young boy who has the ability to produce Modikara that attracts wild Origami. Being of the Sakakibara clan, Hiro is entrusted with guarding the sealed Ushi Origami. Despite this, he attempts to produce a Secret Disk to control Ushi Origami, something his father attempted in vain.
 : Hiro's grandfather, blaming the Ushi Origami for causing a landslide that resulted in the deaths of his son and daughter-in-law, so he has produced a Secret Disk labeled with the kanji for  that is designed to destroy it. Not only does he blame the Ushi Origami for the incident, but he also blames himself because he inspired his son to try to develop a Secret Disk that would control the rogue Origami.
 : Mako's father, a salaryman who transferred to a job position in Hawaii and brought Kyoko with him so she could recover from her battle ordeal. He later returns to Japan in order to bring Mako to Hawaii. He eventually comes to appreciate who his daughter has become and accepts her decision to remain with the Shinkengers in Japan.
 : Mako's mother and the previous Shinken Pink, Kyoko was gravely injured during her group's final battle with Doukoku. Now a paraplegic, Mamoru had brought her with him to Hawaii to aid in her recovery. Though she left Mako without a word, Kyoko had never stopped thinking about her daughter.
 : Hikoma's daughter, whom he left in order to fulfill his duties as retainer to the Shiba Clan. Understanding her father's duties, she lived a relatively normal life, later marrying . Kaori and Koichi have a daughter named .
 : Kaoru's retainer. Arrogant and fiercely loyal to Kaoru, he is highly contemptuous of Takeru and, by extension, Hikoma, and demands that the Shinkengers support Kaoru without question. Tanba often speaks candidly without thinking, which sometimes annoys Kaoru; she hits him in the back of the head with a fan to express her displeasure on these occasions.

Heads of the Shiba House
The previous heads of the Shiba House (Kaoru and Takeru's predecessors) are:
: Shiba Retsudō is the  who battled the Kusare Gedoushu, wielding the Kyoryumaru. After his death, he was buried at the Tengen Temple where the Inromaru is kept.

: Kaoru's father and the seventeenth head of the Shiba family, he set up the idea to use a kagemusha to counter Doukoku's plans to wipe his family out of existence. Masataka sealed Doukoku using the imperfect Sealing Character just before his death; his then-newborn daughter was then taken into hiding and Takeru was presented as the new head of the Shiba House.

Gedoushu
The  are malevolent spirits who arise as the result of sin-tainted souls that enter into the Sanzu River within the land of the dead. The Gedoshu maintain their wretched existence with the water of the Sanzu, and in order to maintain the river's levels, they constantly enter into the human world with the intent of running amok in order to feed the river with negative emotions of humans. If a Gedoshu spends too long in the human world, it eventually dries out, and petrifies if it can not return to the Sanzu. Cursed to be in a state between life and death, a Gedoushu can only be free of its existence if it is slain upon taking its Second Life, or if it is able to let go of the upādāna that damned it in the first place. The Gedoushu under Doukoku reside on the  that sails along the Sanzu River. Others spend their time within the River itself until Doukoku or some other powerful being calls them. Using their ability to enter the living world through cracks and narrow gaps, Doukoku's minions set up a plan to terrorize humans in any way possible so that the river overflows to point of flooding into the mortal realm in order for them to invade in full fury. The Gedoushu can also become powerful during the time of Bon Festival.

In the world of Shinkenger, the Gedoushu are the inspiration of all the yōkai in Japanese mythology. The main Gedoushu characters are modeled after the Seven Lucky Gods and sea creatures.

Doukoku
 is the Bishamonten/spiny lobster-themed leader of the Gedoushu. He is in a constant state of rage, originally endless until he heard the sound of Usuyuki's shamisen, becoming obsessed with her as he later takes her upon her rebirth into Dayu to soothe his rage along with sake. He targeted the Shiba House's previous Shinkengers, making it his goal to eliminate the Shiba House so no one would be able to stop him. However, while fighting the seventeenth head of the Shiba House, he was sealed away as the previous Shinken Red died. This seal was incomplete, and Doukoku was able to revive by the time of the next generation. To reach his goal again, Doukoku sends out Ayakashi to terrorize humans so the Sanzu River can overflow its banks into the mortal realm and enable him to unleash his full fury. This method of attack was later revealed to how he loses the rejuvenating qualities of its waters much faster than any other member of the Gedoushu and takes longer to soak the river's waters back into his body.

Learning of the seal placed on him, Doukoku briefly changes his plans to target Takeru as the death of the Shiba House would ensure that he would never be sealed again. But when that plan failed, Doukoku has his force carry on the original plan without giving wind of this knowledge to any Ayakashi with his own agenda. During the summer while in a comatose state that leaves him open to his enemies, Doukoku manages to suppress his magnified power. Later, after learning of Akamaro's true colors, Doukoku risks his life to enter the mortal realm to repair Dayu's shamisen after driving off Akumaro and defeating Shinken Red. As a result, he has to be submerged in the Sanzu River to rehydrate. But after the Shiba Clan true's eighteenth head is revealed, Doukoku's followers attempt to speed up his awakening by increasing the amount of suffering until Dayu uses Shinza's anguish to bring Doukoku back to the mortal realm. After absorbing Dayu's energy to heal his body, Doukoku gains immunity to the Sealing Character and can now endure being in the mortal realm without drying up. As a result, Doukoku overpowers the Shinkengers before bringing the Rokumon Junk into the mortal realm when the Sanzu River floods the city. Thinking he had broken the Shinkengers' spirits when they attempt to defeat him, Doukoku is immobilized before Shinken Blue delivers the final blow. Assuming his second life, Doukoku overpowers SamuraiHaOh, blasting it and throwing off its components until only ShinkenOh remains, then impales it on his sword. However, the Shinkengers take advantage of the events and mortally wound him before he explodes. He attempts to take the Shinkengers down with him, but this fails as they survive the explosion.

He also possessed the power to seal his fellow Gedoushu.

Tayu
 is Doukoku's Benzaiten/sea slug-themed right hand and the only one he is kind to, provided she knows her place as his obedient, unquestioning servant. Doukoku takes her in after her rebirth as a Gedoushu, giving her the name she now goes by and telling her that she has nowhere else to go but to him. But her unique origins set her apart from normal Gedoshu as she can move freely in the mortal realm. In life, she was  a shamisen player who obsessed over a man named Shinza. Scorned that he loved another woman instead of her, Usuyuki set fire to the building holding his wedding ceremony, killing him, his bride, and the entirety of their wedding party, in a suicidal crime of passion. Seeing that her love would remain unrequited to the bitter end, Usuyuki's emotions corrupt her soul and caused her rebirth into Tayu.

Of all the Gedoushu, Tayu has the most trouble getting along with the Ayakashi because of her previous life as a human, which she makes attempts to reclaim. One failed attempt results with her being saved by Juzo, developing feelings for the Gedounin as she begins to defy Doukoku's orders with her shamisen damaged as a result. Though her feelings for Shinza had long died, Tayu refuses to give him up as it would end her existence and desires to know the purpose behind it. Leaving Doukoku, Tayu wanders aimlessly until she is found by Akumaro who recruits her to his group in return for her instrument's restoration. Upon learning that Akamaro never intended to repair her instrument, she attempts to reclaim her shamisen until Dokouku comes to her aid, using a piece of his body to restore the shamisen and reminding her of her place by his side. Soon after Akumaro's demise, Tayu returns to the Rokumon Junk to assist in Doukoku's reawakening. To that end, after finally having the answers to her questions, Tayu deliberately has Shinken Pink destroy her shamisen to not only discard her past life, but to also use Shinza's anguished soul to revive Doukoku. She later uses the last of her powers to restore Doukoku's body, giving him immunity to the Sealing Character and independence from the Sanzu River. With only her kimono remaining, Doukoku later throws it into the Sanzu River as a final respect to her.

Tayu's shamisen is forcefully bounded to Shinza's soul, creating the eerie and unsettling songs that serve to soothe Doukoku's rage. The shamisen's headstock also doubles as the hilt of a shortsword Tayu uses in battle. While her shamisen is under "repair" by Akumaro, Tayu uses the  dagger as her alternative weapon.

Shitari
 is the Fukurokuju/squid-themed Gedoushu's strategist, a squid-headed demon armed with a shakujō who awaited for Doukoku's revival. Shitari sees humans as mere specimens for his research, uncovering means to overflow the Sanzu River. He also possessed texts from the Shiba House which he used to learn about the seal placed on Doukoku. Though he warns Doukoku not to trouble himself with the Shiba House's sealing character so not to attract attention from certain Ayakashi, Shitari recruits Isagitsune in an attempt to slake his curiosity on what the sealing character is. He later recruits Oinogare in an attempt to re-open a well the Gedoushu used in the past as their base of operations by sacrificing nine maidens, formally introducing himself to the Shinkengers as a result.

While Doukoku is in a vulnerable state struggling with his surging power, the rogue Ayakashi Gozunagumo bullies Shitari into extorting the sealing character from Shinken Red. Despite poisoning Takeru, Shitari fails to get him to reveal the sealing character due to the combined interference of Shinken Gold and Juzo. When Doukoku revives and punishes Gozunagumo, Shitari freely confesses that the one thing he values above Doukoku is his own life and gains forgiveness from his leader out of amusement with his honesty. When Akumaro arrives, Shitari expresses a great deal of distrust over the mysterious Gedoushu and not as much shocked when his impression of him was accurate yet was powerless to do anything against him as he realized Akumaro's intentions. After Dayu returns, Shitari decides to kill off Takeru, only to learn the truth behind him and the Shiba House's true leader and giving up one half of his life, in an attempt to speed up Doukoku's reawakening at the cost of having no second life should he be killed. He remains on the Rokumon Junk during Doukoku's final battle with the Shinkengers, going down with the ship as it sinks in response to its master's death while proclaiming that he will survive regardless of what happens.

Shitari later returns in Tensou Sentai Goseiger vs. Shinkenger: Epic on Ginmaku, becoming Brajira's right hand servant until learning his plan to drain the Sanzu River and refusing to go along with it. But during the climactic battle, gathering an army of followers to kill Buredoran and reclaim the Sanzu River, Shitari ends up facing the Gokaigers when they traveled from the near future and they mistakenly believe him to be a hindrance in their own affairs. With his army ultimately devastated, Shitari is destroyed by Gokai Red using the Go-On Red Ranger Key.

Juzo
 is a mysterious Shōjō/Jurōjin/skeleton-themed Gedoushu, regarded by the others as a lone wolf, yet he seems to know more than Doukoku about the Sanzu River's true potential. 200 years ago, Fuwa was a samurai in life who made a living as an assassin, disenchanted with the ways of bushidō and thriving more on the pleasure of killing his opponents in battle until he can no longer be physically able to wield a sword. He meets Akumaro who provides him with the katana , seemingly unaware that the blade was forged from the souls of his family who tried to free him from his blood lust. However, unlike other Gedounin who die out in a few years, Fuwa endured over the centuries and thus is condemned with an insatiable urge to find an ideal opponent, a fellow samurai who strays from the teachings of bushidō, to clash blades with. As a result, Fuwa mistakes the blade's cries of sadness for an equal lust for battle, believing that the souls of his family have lost their desire to stop him after he entered the Sanzu River.
    
He finds this opponent in Takeru Shiba, after witnessing his sword fighting as Shinken Red. This obsession with fighting Shinken Red leads Doukoku to seal Fuwa's Gedoushu powers, leaving him for dead in the Sanzu River. Although he barely survives with Dayu's aid, he continues to defy Doukoku by making sure that Takeru is at his strongest for their next fight, even curing him of Shitari's poisoning. After a long battle in which he manages to severely wound Shinken Red, Fuwa is defeated and falls off the cliff into the ocean below. However, Fuwa survives with Uramasa's blade snapped in half. He remains in the mountainside until Dayu finds him and relays Akumaro's offer to work for him in return for restoring his blade. To his chagrin, he has to rely on the replacement  that hampers his normal fighting style. Later fed up waiting for the Uramasa to be repaired, Fuwa confronts Akumaro and learns his weapon's origins and that he is a pawn in Akumaro's plan. However, tricking Akumaro into giving him back his weapon and cutting him down, Fuwa reveals he knew the truth behind Uramasa from the first time he held it, thus preventing Akumaro from fulfilling his plan. Later, after the real Shiba House head is revealed, Fuwa gets Takeru to duel him once again before finally falling to him in battle with a delayed hit after Uramasa finally stops its master and denies him his only desire. Uramasa remains in the physical world after Fuwa fades away until the souls that formed it are finally able to depart into the afterlife.

Akumaro
 is an Ebisu/shachihoko-themed Gedoushu general with six slitted eyes and rictus grin, whose ambition is to see Hell and savor the immense suffering that it holds. To that end he needed a Gedonin, killing off Juzo's family to create Uramasa and setting up his descent into Gedou.

Having battled the original Shinkengers in the past, they left him immobilized at the bottom of the Sanzu River. But when Doukoku's power burst revives him, he offers his services to Doukoku as gratitude. However, Doukoku strikes him near his left shoulder, ultimately creating a vulnerable spot. While pretending to aid Dokoku's group in raising the levels of the Sanzu River, taking any abuse from Doukoku to keep up his act, Akumaro starts setting up markers and recruits Juzo and Dayu into his service to make use of them. Eventually found out to be using Doukoku for his own agenda, Akumaro falls back after Doukoku nearly destroys him. However, with Doukoku resting, Akumaro takes the Rokumon Junk as his own while making the finishing touches on his master plan by completing the final marker to open up Hell and finishing Uramasa's repairs. Although he comes close to his goal, Akumaro is left with nothing when he realizes Juzo can not complete the Urami Gandōgaeshi and goes into an enraged fury before the Shinkengers use the Rekka Daizantou and Super Mougyu Bazooka to slay him. After becoming a giant, Akumaro battles the Samurai Giants and DaiGoyou with his Kirigami before SamuraiHaOh uses the Kyoryu Origami to form Super SamuraiHaOh and destroy him, with Akumaro laughing as his desire to see Hell is finally granted with his death.

A master of the black arts, Akumaro can create monsters called Kirigami and teleport short distances to catch his opponents off guard. He also uses his iron claw hands, and kemari as weapons.

Manpuku
However, he is revived by Doukoku along with his followers during the summer-time and offers to kill off the Shinkengers for him with no intent on ruling the mortal realm. With his massive army, Manpuku overwhelmed the Shinkengers until Shinken Red breaks the seal on the Kusare Gedoushu's body to restore the Kyoryu Disk to its full power. After being slain by the five Shinkengers, revived as a giant as he opens up into his true form with a serpentine creature sticking out of his stomach, Manpuku is destroyed by Kyoryu ShinkenOh.

Brajira

Foot soldiers
: The Gedoushu's coral/sea anemone-themed foot soldiers, armed with bajō-zutsu, monk's spades, yumi, and daos, they can freely enter the mortal realm at whim.
In the film, the Kusare Nanashi ("Rotten Nameless") and Kusare Ōnanashi Companies, part of the Kusare Gedoushu, resemble normal Nanashi and Ōnanashi but in purple garbed attire.
In the Special DVD, a rogue member of the Nanashi Company serves as the main antagonist after stealing the Inromaru and using it to become a  before being destroyed by Hyper Shinken Gold and Shinken Red. He is the only member of the Nanashi Company who can speak clearly in Japanese.
However, they, along with Shitari, are ultimately finished by the Gokaigers.
: Nozuchi-themed monsters within the Sanzu River that are more powerful than the Nanashi. The Nosakamata resemble tremendous, skull-like, eyeless, crocodilian heads on two legs, and can shoot fireballs from their mouths.
In the film, the Kusare Nosakamata and the Kusare Ōnosakamata, part of the Kusare Gedoushu, resemble blue skinned Nosakamata and Ōnosakamata.
However, they, along with Shitari, are ultimately finished by the Gokaigers.
: Monsters created by Akumaro from real kirigami he makes by using his claws to cut paper in the shape of a monster, which then transforms into a giant monster. The Kirigimi have two variations: Those with metal pincers for hands, and those with normal hands that wield .
Bibi: See here

Susukodama
The  are a furred ball-like soot settling in roof of the Rokumon Junk's interior, appearing whenever Doukoku's infuriated enough for them to descend, annoyingly repeating people's words while giggling. One accompanies Dayu in her wandering after it is tossed out of the Rokumon Junk and into the mortal realm, singing in imitation of her shamisen. After Dayu sacrifices herself, Doukoku crushes the Susukodama by stepping on it.

Ayakashi
The  are ancient spirits with nightmarish forms that serve the Gedoushu, dwelling within the depths of the Sanzu River until being summoned to go through the gap. However, they can only remain in the mortal world until they begin to dry up, returning to the Sanzu River to regain their moisture. Each Ayakashi has two lives, the human-sized , followed by the giant  after they are slain in their first life.

He is destroyed by Shinken Red in battle, Kagekamuro resurrects into a giant that is destroyed by the Origami. He is the basis of the Ōkamuro.
Send to terrorize humans by causing massive damage and gathering all humans in the area, Ootsumuji is the first Ayakashi to be slain by ShinkenOh. He is the basis of the Kamaitachi.
Shinken Green manages to outwit Rokoruneri and destroy him, with ShinkenOh destroying the Ayakashi when revived. He is the basis of the Tsuchikorobi myth.
Laidback and disturbing in personality, Namiayashi is sent by Shitari to increase the River by doing what he loves best, making others cry. Appearing in the mortal realm before a boy named Ryota, he accomplish his goal by tricking the boy with a false promise of seeing his grandfather again. He is destroyed by Shinken Blue and Shinken Pink, and then destroyed by ShinkenOh. He is the basis of the Suiko myth.
He attacks whatever he considers pointless to exist in order to send humans into a state of utter despair. But as he can be hurt with Modikara, Yanasudare is destroyed by Shinken Red using the Kabuto Disc's power and then destroyed by Kabuto ShinkenOh. He is the basis of the Fusuma of Japanese myth.
 : An Ayakashi armed with the  sent to raise the Sanzu River by tapping in the mind of his victims and finding the one word that best describes them negatively to turn their emotional pain into a physical one. Due to Shinken Yellow's upbringing, she is unaffected consciously and drives Zuboshimeshi off. Resurfacing later, he goes after Shinken Yellow until Shinken Green's meddling allows the Ayakashi's mouth to gagged, then immediately slain with the Kabuto Five Rings Bullet before destroyed again by Kabuto ShinkenOh. His ability to see into the minds of others is the basis of the Satori of Japanese myth.
Clinging to the Rokumon Junk and annoying Doukoku, Yamiororo is sent to the mortal realm to do as much damage as his predecessor had done in the past. However the power of the Kajiki Origami neutralizes his poison as he is destroyed by the Kajiki Five Rings Bullet and then destroyed by Kajiki ShinkenOh. He is the basis of the Kodama of Japanese myth.
He used this ability on both Tora Origami and Ryunosuke, having them fight for him. But after Takeru frees Ryunosuke from Hitomidama's control, he frees the Tora Origami as the Ayakashi is destroyed by the vassals and then destroyed by Tora ShinkenOh. His head, which resembles a big eyeball is the basis of the Hitotsume-kozō of Japanese myth.
Okakurage can also unfold the umbrella on his head to fly and thus have an advantage over his land-based opponents. Okakurage was destroyed by Shinken Green, overwhelming ShinkenOh as a giant until DaiTenku is formed to counter the Ayakashi in the air before finishing him off. He is the basis of the Kasabake of Japanese myth.
 : The most feared among the Ayakashi, armed with the  that he uses in his  attack. He is sent by Shitari to kill Shinken Red, but Juzo's interference forces him to fall back when he starts to dry up. Ushirobushi later resumes his task, only to be destroyed by the Tora Five Rings Bullet and finally destroyed by Tenku ShinkenOh. He is the basis of the Otoroshi of Japanese myth.
Nakinakite can also create the deadly infantile  that latch onto his opponents and slowly increase in weight over time if unhappy, eventually crushing his opponents. Nakinakite is destroyed by Shinken Yellow and Shinken Pink, and then destroyed by ShinkenOh after he was being weighed down by DaiTenku. He and his Akaoniko are the basis of the Konaki-jijī of Japanese myth.
 : An Ayakashi that has the features of an elephant and is capable of breathing fire. Being extremely short tempered, he actually provoked Doukoku out of not being called forth before Dayuu convinces him to turn his anger issue on the humans. When the Shinkengers attempt to fight him, they learn that only Shinken Blue's Modikara can wound him. He was first destroyed by the Kajiki Five Rings Bullet and then destroyed by Tenku ShinkenOh. He is the basis of the Chōchinobake of Japanese myth.
 : A happy go-lucky Ayakashi with the ability to assume the guise of another, armed with the  that can split into two. He assumed Chiaki's form to cause trouble among the team, intending to kill the confused and depressed Chiaki once he complete his plan. However, seeing his reflection, Chiaki tricks him in order to expose him to the others. He was first destroyed by the Kabuto Five Rings Bullet and then destroyed by Tenku ShinkenOh. He is the basis of the faceless Noppera-bō of Japanese myth.
 : A whiny, introverted Ayakashi with the ability to curl into his snail-like ironclad armor who's bent on making everyone more miserable than he is. But using a combination of heat and water, the Shinkengers manage to weaken the shell to use the Tora Five Rings Bullet to destroy him. Revived, he is weakened by the elemental attacks of ShinkenOh's Kabuto and Kajiki armor forms before it becomes Tora ShinkenOh to finish him off. He is the inspiration for the Sazae-oni of Japanese myth.
Using his , he steals a hair from Takeru to conduct his  to spy on Takeru to look for the sealing character until his cover is blown. He is destroyed by Shinken Gold, and then destroyed by Tenku ShinkenOh with help from the Ika Origami. He is the basis of the Kitsune of Japanese myth.
He goes to fight the Shinkengers to avenge Isagitsune, nearly killing the five before he falls back into the Sanzu River. By the time he resumes his campaign of vengeance, the Shinkengers have Shinken Gold by their side. He is destroyed by a Fiery Dance/Hundred Fillets combo, Hyakuyappa battled ShinkenOh upon being revived before Shinken Gold arrives in the Ika Origami to form Ika ShinkenOh who freezes the Ayakashi before finishing him off with Squid Flash. He is the basis of the Amikiri of Japanese myth.
However, the attack was used against him when Shinken Red uses his Fiery Dance attack to ignite Oinogare's body in flames as Shinken Gold and Shinken Blue (with the Sakanamaru and Blue's Shinkenmaru tied to their hands) destroy him with their Current Hundred Fillets attack. In the end, the revived Ayakasahi is frozen by Ika ShinkenOh and destroyed with the Squid Flash. He is the basis of the Abura-sumashi of Japanese myth.
 : An Ayakashi armed with the  who steals peoples' souls with his  and break up his body in his  offense/defense combo. Acquiring a large number of 54 souls, including Kotoha's, Utakasane reveals the souless bodies have a day to live before falling back into the Sanzu River so that he wouldn't be destroyed before his mission is complete. However, Genta planted a Modikara on Utakasane that not only forces him back to the mortal realm when Ebi Orgami is brought to life, but also to keep him from utilizing his Hundred Separation move. He is destroyed by the Shinkengers, Utakasane is destroyed by DaiKaiOh Higashi's Lobster Claw True Payback. He is the basis of the |Uwan of Japanese myth.
Finding the Rokumon Junk empty, Sasamatage decides to cause trouble on his own by placing his eggs on humans to make them violent. He is destroyed by the teamwork of Shinken Red, Blue and Yellow, Sasamatage enlarges and is quickly destroyed by the teamwork of Tenku ShinkenOh and DaiKaiOh. He is the basis of the Kameosa of Japanese myth.
Lives to slurp up lives, acting out of the Gedoushu, while Doukoku is resting. He looks for a tasty life and finds it in Matsumiya, possessing the young man's clothing through his feelings for Kotoha. When Kotoha breaks Matsumiya's heart, Urawadachi is forced out before being destroyed by the Tora Five Rings Bullet and then destroyed by Ika DaiKaiOh. He is the basis of the Ittan-momen of Japanese myth.
 : A spider-like Ayakashi who is unwilling to continue taking orders from Doukoku. Gozunagumo recruits Shitari to aid him in disposing of Doukoku by finding out what the sealing character is. Though he overpowered the vassals, to give Shitari time to get the Sealing Character from Takeru, Gozunagumo is sucked back to the Rokumon Junk, as the newly awakened Doukoku punishes him for his attempt on him by infusing him with his power, turning the Ayakashi into a mindless beast as he destroyed by Super Shinken Red and then destroyed by DaiKai ShinkenOh with the IkaTenku Buster. He is the basis of the Gyuki of Japanese myth.
 : A man-eating Ayakashi that looks like a rhinoceros-like monster with a sideways elephant-like head behind it. He was sent to put Dayu to sleep and remember her origin by exuding a sleep-inducing mist. Once his job is done, he then enters the dream world so he can eat the dream incarnations of his human victims (thereby killing them). However, Shinken Blue and Shinken Green enter the Dream World after him and force the Ayakashi out before breaking his hold over his victims. He is the basis of the Baku of Japanese myth.
 : An Ayakashi who ends his sentences with "shaka." He is able to spin around with destructive force. He is initially defeated by Super Shinken Yellow, and then destroyed by SamuraiHaOh. He is the basis of the Yama-oroshi of Japanese myth.
After being slain by Shinken Blue and Green, he is destroyed by MouGyuDaiOh. He is the basis of the Betobeto-san of Japanese myth.
After being slain by Super Shinken Red, he is destroyed by MouGyuDaiOh. He is the basis of the Tsurubebi of Japanese myth.
 : An Ayakashi summoned by Shitari for the task of killing the eighteenth head of the Shiba House: Takeru. After being slain by Super Shinken Red, she is destroyed by the Sisi Origami when it is piloted by Kaoru Shiba, the true eighteenth head of the Shiba House. She is the basis of the Onmoraki of Japanese myth.
Sent by Shitari to increase enough human suffering to wake Doukoku from his slumber, Oborojime was given half of Shitari's life force which gave him an additional , a serpentine mist-like form. His first two lives taken by the Mougyu Bazooka and Tenku ShinkenOh, it finally takes SamuraiHaOh to destroy Oborojime in his third life. He is the basis of the Enenra of Japanese myth.

Akumaro's Ayakashi
These Ayakashi are used in Akumaro's plans to open the pathway between the mortal realm and Hell, each given an arena to cause enough anguish to create a marker.

 : An Ayakashi armed with the  who came into being around the same time as Doukoku, though he serves under Akumaro. Representing his master, Abekonbe emerges from bottom of the Sanzu River to offer his aid to Doukoku. Able to fire orbs from his mouth, Abekonbe possesses the power to switch people's souls with that of inanimate objects, intent on using this ability to turn the mortal realm where people unintentionally kill each other. After being forced to mortally wound his body to undo his spell upon being tricked, Abekonbe is destroyed by DaiKai ShinkenOh. He is the basis of the Kasha of Japanese myth.
Dokurobou has the ability to create shadow clones of himself, using them to weaken his opponents while he waits for them to falter and then make his move. But this ability is countered by DaiGoyou. His appearance is the basis of the Kyōkotsu of Japanese myth.
 : An Ayakashi who serves under Akumaro and is able to control people with strings like a puppeteer. Targeting the Takashiro Academy, Kugutsukai intends to create a puppet army out of the student body. Once he is discovered, the Ayakashi uses his army on the Shinkengers. He is slain by Super Shinken Blue before being destroyed again by Shinken DaiGoyou. He is the basis of the Kosode-no-te of Japanese myth.
 : An Ayakashi armed with the  who can shoot fireballs from his body. Serving under Akumaro, he is sent to acquire the Ushi Origami by any means. When he fails, Happouzu decides to destroy the Origami instead. He is ultimately destroyed by MouGyuDaiOh. He is the basis of the Raijū of Japanese myth.
 : A gluttonous Ayakashi who serves under Akumaro, capable of consuming objects with his hands. Sent to the mortal realm, Futagawara eats everything in sight, including Ryunosuke's Shodo Phone. By the time he gets full, Futagawara is killed by Juzo and Dayu in order for Akumaro's plan to complete with the Ayakashi showing his true power. Once in his second life, Futagawara's arms are converted into two halves of a nearly impenetrable wall with a face whose eyes shoot beams. He manages to withstand DaiKai ShinkenOh's attacks before being destroyed once and for all by SamuraiHaOh, after breaching the wall and then using the Modikara Great Shot Circle. His second life is the basis of the Nurikabe of Japanese myth.
After being slain by Super Shinken Yellow, he is destroyed by SamuraiHaOh. He is the basis of the Gaki of Japanese myth.
After being slain by Super Shinken Red, he is destroyed by DaiKai ShinkenOh with the IkaTenku Buster. He is the basis of the Hitōban of Japanese myth.

Other Ayakashi
 : An Ayakashi who appears in Kamen Rider Decade episodes 24 and 25. He steals the Diendriver from Kamen Rider Diend and becomes , no longer dependent on the Sanzu River while able to summon Nanashi from the cracks on his body and summon monsters from cards. Causing a distortion in their world with his existence, the Shinkengers manage to destroy Chinomanako with help from Kamen Riders Decade and Kuuga. He is the basis of the Mokumokuren of Japanese myth.
 : A  armed with the  who is the last surviving member of the Kusare Gedoushu. Intent on succeeding where Manpuku failed, Azemidoro sets up a trap for the Shinkengers, taking advantage of humans' selfless actions. In the end, he underestimates the Shinkengers and is defeated by Hyper Shinken Red before being destroyed by Kyoryu ShinkenOh and DaiKaiOh. He is the basis of the Dorotabō of Japanese myth.
 : An Ayakashi armed with the twin , assigned by Doukoku to aid the Gaiark President Batcheed in Samurai Sentai Shinkenger vs. Go-onger: GinmakuBang!!. After being slain by the Shinkengers and the Go-ongers, he is used by Batcheed as a living shield and is subsequently destroyed by the Origami and the Engines. He is the basis of the Oboroguruma of Japanese myth.
 : A maniacal Ayakashi armed with the  who after assuming his second life, Demebakuto uses his Enveloping Hands to trap the Shinkengers in a movie-based dream world with his revolving lantern and its dream-word counterparts keeping the illusion up. After breaking free, they use DaiKai ShinkenOh to turn his attack on him before finally destroying him. He is the basis of the Te-no-me of Japanese myth. He appears in Samurai Sentai Shinkenger Returns.
 : An Ayakashi who shoots water from his head and uses the  sealing an opponent into his water. He only appears in a manga adaptation of Samurai Sentai Shinkenger.
 : An Ayakashi who appeared in Tensou Sentai Goseiger vs. Shinkenger: Epic on Ginmaku. He aided Buredoran with his attempts to destroy the Goseigers' homeworld. He has the power to redirect the Goseiger's elemental attacks, but when the Shinkengers combined their power with the Goseiger's power, he was unable to redirect the attacks and was overwhelmed. After the Shinkenger and Goseiger kill him once, he is destroyed by Ground Gosei Great and DaiKai ShinkenOh. He is the basis of the Yama-biko of Japanese myth.
: An Ayakashi who appears in the Samurai Sentai Shinkenger tie-in novel. Prior to his Gedou transformation, Shura was an officer named , whose descent into madness started after losing his two daughters to an accident. He became a mass murderer in 2008 and was seemingly killed from a fall while on the run from the authorities. In the present day, he was resurrected into an Ayakashi and spread a virus that caused his victims to relieve the fear of losing their loved ones from their past. After being defeated in his first life, his residual thought manifests a giant version of himself which fought against Ika Shinken-Oh until he realizes the error of his ways and finally passes on to the afterlife.

Notes

References

Super Sentai characters